Michelle Ross was the stage name of Earl Barrington Shaw (August 5, 1954 – March 27, 2021), a Jamaican Canadian drag queen who was active from 1974 until her death in 2021. She was considered one of the key icons of the LGBTQ community in Toronto, especially for Black Canadian members of the community.

She performed in drag for the first time at Toronto's Club Manatee in 1974, to Dionne Warwick's "Anyone Who Had a Heart". In Toronto, she was a regular performer at bars in the Church and Wellesley gay village, and a frequent performer at Pride Toronto's Blockorama parties. She also performed internationally, including a six-year stint as part of the cast of a touring production of La Cage aux Folles. She had small acting roles in the 1977 film Outrageous!, and the 2014 film Seek, and appeared in the documentary films Divas: Love Me Forever and Our Dance of Revolution.

Throughout her career, she was known for performing to the music of disco and soul music divas such as Patti LaBelle, Gloria Gaynor and Gladys Knight, but was most famous for her performances of Diana Ross songs. As of 2018, she had performed on stage at least 15,000 times. Dancer and choreographer Hollywood Jade got his start choreographing numbers for Ross.

She once expressed her drag philosophy about the difference between men and women as "Both sides are equally part of the glamour. I see them as stories that are ready for a makeover." 
Her signature move was to remove her wig at the end of her set, to call attention to drag as a performance.

In 2019, she was named as one of 69 key Canadian LGBTQ icons in the Canadian Screen Award-winning Super Queeroes multimedia project. Following the announcement of her death on March 28, 2021, statements of tribute were issued by a variety of influential figures including Toronto mayor John Tory, writer Rinaldo Walcott and drag queens Brooke Lynn Hytes and Priyanka, and organizations including Pride Toronto, The 519, Glad Day Bookshop and the Toronto chapter of Black Lives Matter.

In the third season of the drag competition series Canada's Drag Race, competitor Jada Shada Hudson paid tribute to Ross as a trailblazer and inspiration, both in a mid-season workroom discussion about community icons and in her runway speech in the season finale.

Filmography

Film

References

1954 births
2021 deaths
Canadian drag queens
Black Canadian LGBT people
Jamaican drag queens
Jamaican emigrants to Canada
People from Toronto
Jamaican LGBT people
20th-century Canadian LGBT people
21st-century Canadian LGBT people